Lydden and Temple Ewell Downs is a  biological Site of Special Scientific Interest north-west of Dover in Kent. It is a Special Area of Conservation and Nature Conservation Review site. It is also part of the  Lydden Temple Ewell National Nature Reserve and the  Lydden Temple Ewell nature reserve, which is managed by the Kent Wildlife Trust. It is in the South Downs Area of Outstanding Natural Beauty.

This site has some of the richest chalk downland in the county. The invertebrate community is outstanding, including butterflies such as marbled whites, adonis blue and the very rare silver-spotted skipper.

There is public access to the site, which is in several nearby areas.

References

Kent Wildlife Trust
Sites of Special Scientific Interest in Kent
Special Areas of Conservation in England
National nature reserves in England